Ishq Mein Marjawan 2 ( 2) is an Indian romantic thriller television series and spiritual sequel to Ishq Mein Marjawan produced by Yash A Patnaik. It starred Helly Shah, Rrahul Sudhir and Vishal Vashishtha.

The show premiered on Colors TV on 13 July 2020 and went off air on 13 March 2021. It shifted to digital streaming on Voot Select with a  new Season named Ishq Mein Marjawan 2: Naya Safar from 15 March 2021. The show ended on 5 July 2021.

It is the second installment of the Ishq Mein Marjawan series.

Plot
The story revolves around Riddhima, an orphaned physiotherapist who is madly in love with her fiancé Kabir Sharma, a cop who sends her on a mission as an undercover agent to nab Vansh Rai Singhania, a business tycoon running illegal businesses throughout Southeast Asia.

Riddhima enters Vansh's cruise party as a party planner. A series of events unfolds in the cruise that leads to Vansh hiring her as his sister Sia's physiotherapist. Eventually, Vansh begins to doubt her and coerces her to marry him to find out her real intention. She agrees, upon being pressed by Kabir.

On the next day of the marriage, Riddhima finds a statue of Vansh's ex-fiancée Ragini. Believing him to be Ragini's killer, she plans to discover the truth about Ragini's death as it could provide major evidence against Vansh.

Next, she comes across a secret room in the mansion, where Riddhima sees a painting and another statue of a woman. The woman in the painting is in fact Vansh's biological mother, Uma Rai Singhania who left him without saying a word when he was young. Slowly, after listening to his story, Riddhima develops a soft corner for Vansh.

Meanwhile, it is revealed that actually Kabir had  loved Riddhima in the past. However, at present he was using her for his mission and was actually revealed to be  Anupriya’s son. Kabir wants revenge from Vansh for his father's death and Anupriya wants to usurp Vansh's position and his businesses. In the mansion, Vansh begins to fall for Riddhima after she takes a bullet for him. Contrary to Kabir's expectations, Riddhima too slowly begins to reciprocate her feelings for Vansh. With the fear of his mission's failure, Kabir plans to remind Riddhima of her past and mission but it doesn't affect her. A series of events reveals the truth about Anupriya's son to the Rai Singhania's. However, Anupriya manages to keep her son's identity a secret.

Meanwhile, Kabir asks Riddhima to find evidence about Ragini's murder. Nevertheless, Riddhima defends Vansh, saying that he cannot commit such a crime. The same day, Riddhima gets a memory card containing a video beneath Ragini's statue and secretly watches it. The video shows Vansh pointing a gun at Ragini however not shooting. Riddhima accidentally comes across Ragini only to find her alive and kept secretly under Vansh. Some misunderstandings make Riddhima believe that Vansh wants to harm Ragini, thus she joins Kabir to remove Ragini from the clutches of Vansh. Losing Ragini, Vansh breakdowns and reveals to Riddhima that his mother was actually murdered and Ragini knew the killer. A flashback showing Anupriya was the killer. A series of events lead Sia into knowing Riddhima's truth and thus blackmailing her to bring Ragini back to Vansh. Sia soon learns of Anupriya's crime however was injured in coma because of the same. Ragini is shot by Kabir, and Vansh is falsely framed and arrested for the murder. Kabir and Anupriya make Vansh into believing that Riddhima betrayed him and he jumps off a cliff thus dying in front of both Riddhima and Kabir.

A lookalike of Vansh, 'Vihaan' is introduced. Meanwhile, Kabir enters VR mansion as Anupriya's son. Kabir reveals to Riddhima his entire plan leaving her helpless. Vihaan is a hacker and a gold-digger. He intentionally plans to meet Riddhima. Riddhima is initially surprised seeing Vihaan, but later joins hands with him to get rid of Kabir from VR mansion, in exchange for a large sum of money. But afterwards, Vihaan reveals to Riddhima that Vansh used him as a body double in dangerous situations. Later on, it is revealed that Vihaan is actually Vansh who is playing mind games with Riddhima to know the truth. 

Later on, someone puts a bomb in Riddhima's sandal which Vansh takes out in the right time thus saving her. Vansh discloses that it was Anupriya who killed his mother gets her arrested. While leaving the mansion Anupriya attempts to shoot Vansh but Riddhima takes the bullet once again thus saving him. Vansh confesses to Riddhima that he is not Vihaan but Vansh. She is taken to the hospital and saved. Vansh and Riddhima return to the VR Mansion. Ahana enters the mansion to bring new twists and turns in their lives. Kabir later reveals that Ahana is his future wife. Meanwhile, Vansh challenges Riddhima to prove her love for him by killing Kabir. When Riddhima fails to do this, Vansh gets more mad. They go on a vacation where Vansh leaves her and returns to the VR mansion. At home, he holds a press conference, stating that Ahana is his wife. When Riddhima returns to the mansion, everyone claims to have forgotten her nevertheless, Sia starts calling her. Vansh, although having hatred for Riddhima, lets her stay as he wants Sia to recover. Rhiddhima was soon after kicked out of the mansion but Sia discloses her truth. Vansh realizes his mistakes and brings Rhiddhima back to the mansion. Soon after, Riddhima wants to find out what happened to her parents, which leaves Vansh shocked. It is later revealed that Vansh has a connection to Riddhima's parents' death. Vansh decides to marry Riddhima once again so Riddhima can focus on the wedding and not her parents however, during the marriage rituals, Riddhima learns about her parents' death. It was revealed that Ishani, Vansh’s sister killed Riddhima's parents. Nevertheless, Vansh tells everyone that at the age of 15, he accidentally murdered Kabir's father and aunt. Riddhima misunderstood that Vansh had killed her parents and upon knowing the truth she punishes herself by walking on glass. However, Vansh saves and forgives her. Later, Kabir recognizes his love for Riddhima and realizes that he has lost her forever. Nevertheless, he doesn't accept his defeat and decides to win her back at any cost.

Later on, Riddhima becomes pregnant with Vansh's child however, Vansh is not ready to have a child because he thinks that his businesses world is too dangerous for him/her. Riddhima tries to convince him many times but he doesn’t listen to her. Riddhima starts getting calls from the abortion center, but she doesn’t talk to Vansh about it as she thinks it would stress him out more. However, Vansh later realizes his mistake and accepts the child. At the VR mansion, someone kidnaps Riddhima and takes her to the abortion Centre but Riddhima somehow escapes and reaches the mansion. Vansh misunderstands their child for being no more and confronts Riddhima. Riddhima gets to know that Ishani was the person who had sent her to abortion Centre and she reveals this to Vansh. Riddhima also tells Vansh that their baby is alive.

Vansh makes a plan to change his and Riddhima's identity to Aayansh and Shefali Malhotra and leave India. However, this plan was simply to distract their enemies. The actual plan was to fake their death in front of the family however, Aryan foils the plan. Kabir locks Vansh in a room full of fire but is later saved. Kabir tries to forcibly marry Riddhima but is saved by Vansh. Chang's goons chase Riddhima and Vansh. In order to save themselves from the goons, Vansh and Riddhima jump off the cliff. The two ill-fated lovers are reunited in their death.

Cast

Main
Helly Shah as Riddhima Raisinghania: A Physiotherapist and part-time Party Planner; Sara / Gayatri and Sejal's childhood friend; Kabir's ex-fiancé; Vansh's wife. (2020-2021)
 Rrahul Sudhir as Vansh Raisinghania: A Mafia Businessman, Ajay and Uma's son; Ishani and Sia's elder brother; Anupriya's step-son; Kabir's step-brother; Ragini's ex-fiancée; Riddhima's husband; Ahana's fake husband. (2020–2021)
Vishal Vashishtha as Kabir Sharma: A Cunning Cop; Anupriya's son; Vansh, Ishani and Sia's step-brother; Neha's collague; Riddhima's ex fiancee and Ahana's fake fiancé. (2020–2021)

Recurring
 Meenakshi Sethi as Indrani Raisinghania: Ajay and Rudra's mother; Vansh, Ishani, Siya and Aryan's grandmother. (2020–2021)
 Zayn Ibad Khan as Angre:Vansh's loyal employee and right-hand; Ishani's husband. (2021)
 Khalida Jaan as Anupriya Raisinghania: Ajay's second wife; Kabir's mother; Riddhima's mother-in-law; Vansh, Ishani and Sia's step-mother; Daima (fake) (2020–2021)
 Chandni Sharma as Ishani Raisinghania: Ajay and Uma's first daughter; Vansh's younger sister; Siya's elder sister; Aryan's cousin; Anupriya's first step daughter; Kabir's first step younger sister; Sunny's ex fiancee; Angre's wife. (2020-2021)
 Nikita Tiwari as Sia Raisinghania: Ajay and Uma's second daughter; Vansh and Iani's younger sister; Aryan's cousin; Anupriya's second step-daughter; Kabir's second step-sister; Vyom's ex love interest. (2020–2021)
 Geetu Bawa as Chanchal Rudra Raisinghania: Rudra's wife; Aryan's mother. (2020–2021)
 Jay Zaveri as Rudra Raisinghania: Indrani's younger son; Ajay's younger brother; Chanchal's husband; Aryan's father. (killed by Anupriya) (2020-2021)
 Manasvi Vashist as Aryan Raisinghania: Rudra and Chanchal's son; Vansh, Ishani and Sia's cousin; Kabir's step-cousin; Sejal, Kiara and Sara / Gayatri's ex love interest. (2020–2021)
 Mihir Mishra as Ajay Raisinghania: Indrani's elder son, Rudra' brother; Uma and Anupriya's husband; Vansh, Ishani , Kabir and Siya's father. (2021)
 Bhavya Katri as Uma Raisinghania: Ajay's first wife; Vansh, Ishani and Sia's biological mother. (2020)
 Sushmita Banik as Ragini: Vansh's former fiancée. (2020)
Mansi Srivastava as Aahana: Kabir's fake fiancée; Vansh's fake wife. (2020–2021)
 Muohit Joushi as Sunny: Ishani's former fiancé. (2020)
 Smita Sharan as Sejal: Riddhima's childhood friend. (2020–2021)
 Riya Bhattacharjee as Kiara: Aryan's ex love interest. (2021)
 Kristina Patel as Sara/Gayatri: a contract killer; Riddhima's childhood friend. (2021)
 Aashcharya Vikas as Chitwan: A novelist who is Chanchal's brother. (2020–2021)
 Mohit Sinha as Pingle: Kabir's friend and an agent  (2020–2021)
 Rajat Swani as Mishra: Kabir's assistant. (2020–2021)
 Madhurima Tuli as Neha: A secret agent and Kabir's colleague.(2020)
 Sushma Murudkar as Mrs. D'Souza: VR Mansion's housekeeper. Killed by Anupriya. (2020)

Special appearances
 Jigyasa Singh as Heer Singh from Shakti - Astitva Ke Ehsaas Ki (2020)
 Akshit Sukhija  as Raja Reshammiya from Shubharambh (2020)
 Mahima Makwana as Rani Dave Reshammiya from Shubharambh (2020)
 Nimrit Kaur Ahluwalia as Meher Kaur Gill from Choti Sarrdaarni (2020)
 Riya Sharma as Mayura Dubey from Pinjra Khoobsurti Ka (2020)
 Sahil Uppal as Omkaar Shukla from Pinjra Khoobsurti Ka (2020)

Production

Development and premiere
The first promo of the series was released on 22 January 2020 while the second appeared on 10 March 2020. The second promo revealed that the series would premiere on 30 March 2020. However, due to COVID–19 pandemic, it was postponed to 13 July 2020.

Filming

On 24 September 2020, the filming was stopped for a few days when lead Rrahul Sudhir tested positive for COVID-19 but after his negative testing report, filming resumed thereafter.

Extension
Ishq Mein Marjawan 2 got an extension titled Ishq Mein Marjawan 2: Naya Safar aired from 15 March 2021 to 5 July 2021, replacing Ishq Mein Marjawan 2 on Voot.

Adaptations

Episodes

References

External links
 

Indian mystery television series
Hindi-language television shows
Colors TV original programming
2020 Indian television series debuts